Shigar is the headquarter of its namesake district and tehsil in the Baltistan division of Gilgit–Baltistan in northern Pakistan. It is located at the bank of Shigar River in the most remote and dramatic part of the region. It is a popular site for tourists and trekkers and contains many historical buildings of architectural significance associated with several different communities.

The town is inhabited almost exclusively by the Balti people of Tibetan descent. Almost 65% of the population belongs to the Shia sect of Islam, 26% to the Norbakhshi sect and the remaining to the Sunni sect. Via the Shigar Valley, it is the gateway to the Karakoram mountain range, which has five eight-thousanders, including K2.

History 
According to tradition, Syed Ali Hamdani arrived to Shigar in the late 14th century and converted the locals to Islam. To this day, mosques and khanqahs attributed to him exist in the region.

Tourist attractions

Popular tourist attractions in the town include:                              
 Dambuchan Hurchose Shigar
 Shigar Fort
 Amburik Mosque
 Khilingrong Mosque
 Khanqah-e-Muallah Shigar
 Hashoo pi Bhag
 Khubanistan Agri Tourisem model village
 Khubanistan Ranga
 Marapi Ranga
 Ree Masjid
 Astana of Syed Mir Yahya
 Khureed Ranga Gulabpur
 Choutran (Garam Chasma)
 Hlanokhore Bridge 
 Khanqah Gulabpur
 Wazirpur Khanqah
 Bissel (Garam Chasma)
 Hassan Abad (Bunpa)
Kharmang Pi Dus

Climate
Shigar has a cold desert climate (Köppen: BWk).

Gallery

See also
Shigar Fort
Shigar Valley

References

Populated places in Shigar District
Baltistan